The NWA Southwest Junior Heavyweight Championship was a professional wrestling championship defended in the Amarillo, Texas territory of the National Wrestling Alliance, Western States Sports.

Title history

Footnotes

References

External links
Wrestling-Titles.com

National Wrestling Alliance championships
Regional professional wrestling championships
Western States Sports championships